Frank Leslie Oliver Thorn (16 August 1912 – 11 February 1942) was an Australian cricketer. He played seven first-class cricket matches for Victoria between 1937 and 1939.

Thorn was a medium-paced bowler who dismissed Don Bradman for five in the Sheffield Shield when Bradman was aiming to hit a world-record seventh consecutive first-class century in 1938–39. He had taken 5 for 111 and 5 for 74 against Tasmania earlier in the same season. 

Thorn joined the Royal Australian Air Force in February 1941. He was a member of a bomber's crew that crashed during a mission to bomb Japanese destroyers at Gasmata harbour in New Britain in February 1942. The plane's wreckage was not found for more than 60 years.

See also
 List of cricketers who were killed during military service

References

External links
 

1912 births
1942 deaths
People from St Arnaud
Australian cricketers
Victoria cricketers
Australian military personnel killed in World War II
Royal Australian Air Force personnel of World War II
Royal Australian Air Force officers